Çezar Kurti is an Albanian translator, known for his many contributions to Albanian literature.
He was born in Kavajë, Albania, in 1935. After completing his studies in Russian language and literature, Mr. Kurti worked as an editor/translator for the Albanian Telegraphic Agency. He was appointed professor of Russian at the University of Tirana and became Chairman of the Russian Department there. In 1976, charged with disseminating anticommunist propaganda, professor Kurti was dismissed from the University and was sent to the copper mines of Kurbnesh, in Mirdita. From 1976, when he published his Albanian translation of John Galsworthy's The Forsyte Salvation, until 1985, professor Kurti was not allowed to publish his work. With the help of his friends, he published his Albanian translation of Aeschylus's Prometheus Bound and Antoine de Saint Exupéry's Wind, Sand and Stars. In 1989, he edited Tolstoy's War and Peace.  In 1992 he co-authored the English-Albanian Polytechnical Vocabulary. In 1993 he published a translation of Shakespeare's sonnets into Albanian and in 1994, F. Dostoyevsky's Records from the House of the Dead. His verse translation of Dante's Inferno has been published only in excerpts. In 1998 he has also published Bashkebisedues Shqip anglisht (Albanian–English Conversations).

Professor Kurti has focused on translating works by poets and writers such as Aeschylus, Dante, Dostoyevsky, Chalamov, and Havel to underscore his opposition to the violence exercised against human rights in his country and to contribute to the establishment of democratic thinking in Albania.

Today, professor Kurti resides in New York City in which he continues to write and translate works into Albanian. His book Learn Albanian has sold in record amounts. His books are used in several American and UK universities.

References

Albanian translators
Living people
English–Albanian translators
1935 births
Academics from Kavajë